Josef Frühmesser (1929–1995) born in Gutach in the Black Forest was a German painter who studied at the Kunstschule Düsseldorf and later worked in Augsburg. He mainly dealt with  landscape paintings of the South German Prealpes.

References

External links 
 arcadja.com
 mehlis.eu
 eart.de
 Listed original works of Frühmesser

1929 births
1995 deaths
20th-century German painters
20th-century German male artists